Frans Devooght (1939–2008) was a Belgian darts player who competed in the British Darts Organisation (BDO)  in the 1980s and 1990s.

Devooght won the Dutch Open back to back in 1984 and 1985 and then captured the Swiss Open in 1986. He then played in the 1987 BDO World Darts Championship, beating Avtar Gill 3–1 in the first round before losing to former World Champion Jocky Wilson 3–1 in the second round. After a five-year absence, he returned to Lakeside at the 1992 BDO World Darts Championship where he was defeated by Englishman Graham Miller 3–1 in the first round.

World Championship performances

BDO

1987: Second Round (lost to Jocky Wilson 1–3)
1992: First Round (lost to Graham Miller 1–3)

References
 Darts Database

Belgian darts players
Living people
British Darts Organisation players
1939 births